The discography of Oleta Adams, an American singer, consists of seven studio albums, two compilations, a holiday album, and twenty singles.

Albums

Studio albums

Compilation albums

Singles

As main artist

As featured artist

Other appearances

Other recorded songs

Videography

Video albums

Music videos

References

Discographies of American artists
Pop music discographies